Stigmella dentatae is a moth of the family Nepticulidae. It is found in Japan (Hokkaido), Russia (Primorsky Krai) and China (Heilongjiang).

Adults are on wing in May and again from July to September. There are two generations per year.

The larvae feed on Quercus mongolica (including var. grosseserrata in Japan) and Quercus dentata (in Primorskiy Kray). They mine the leaves of their host plant. The mine consists of a long narrow linear gallery with linear black frass throughout, similar to Stigmella aladina and  Stigmella roborella.

External links
Nepticulidae (Lepidoptera) in China, 1. Introduction and Stigmella (Schrank) feeding on Fagaceae

Nepticulidae
Moths of Asia
Moths described in 1984